Tobacco Control is an international peer-reviewed journal covering the nature and consequences of tobacco use worldwide; tobacco's effects on population health, the economy, the environment, and society; efforts to prevent and control the global tobacco epidemic through population-level education and policy changes; the ethical dimensions of tobacco control policies; and the activities of the tobacco industry and its allies.

It was established in 1992 and is published by BMJ Group. The founding editor-in-chief was Ronald Davis (Michigan Department of Community Health), and the current one is Ruth Malone (University of California San Francisco). 

According to the Journal Citation Reports, the journal has a 2019 impact factor of 6.726.

Editors
The following people have served as editor-in-chief of the journal:
 1992-1998: Ronald Davis (Michigan Department of Community Health)
 1998-2008: Simon Chapman (University of Sydney)
 Since 2009: Ruth Malone (University of California San Francisco)

Abstracting and indexing 
The journal is abstracted and indexed in:
 Index Medicus/MEDLINE/PubMed
 Current Contents/Clinical Medicine
 Current Contents/Social & Behavioural Sciences
 Science Citation Index
 Social Sciences Citation Index
 Google Scholar
 CINAHL

See also 
 Tobacco control

References

External links 
 

Tobacco control journals
BMJ Group academic journals
Quarterly journals
Publications established in 1992
English-language journals
Addiction medicine journals